Sveta Trojica (in older sources Žilče pri Sveti Trojici) is a small village north of Velike Bloke in the Municipality of Bloke in the Inner Carniola region of Slovenia.

Name
The name of the settlement was changed from Sveta Trojica (literally, 'Holy Trinity') to Šivče in 1955. The name was changed on the basis of the 1948 Law on Names of Settlements and Designations of Squares, Streets, and Buildings as part of efforts by Slovenia's postwar communist government to remove religious elements from toponyms. The name Sveti Trojica was restored in 1991. Locally, the settlement is known as Trojica.

Church

The parish church in the settlement, from which the village gets its name, is dedicated to the Holy Trinity and belongs to the Roman Catholic Archdiocese of Ljubljana.

References

External links

Sveta Trojica on Geopedia

Populated places in the Municipality of Bloke